Denis Valerievich Kuzin (born 4 December 1989) is a world champion speed skater from Kazakhstan.

In the 2013 World Single Distance Championships he won the gold medal in the 1000 meters race.

Personal records

References

External links
 Denis Kuzin's profile at the ISU
 Denis Kuzin at the SpeedSkatingStats.com

1989 births
Kazakhstani male speed skaters
Speed skaters at the 2010 Winter Olympics
Speed skaters at the 2014 Winter Olympics
Speed skaters at the 2018 Winter Olympics
Speed skaters at the 2022 Winter Olympics
Olympic speed skaters of Kazakhstan
People from Kostanay
Living people
Asian Games medalists in speed skating
Speed skaters at the 2011 Asian Winter Games
Speed skaters at the 2017 Asian Winter Games
Asian Games gold medalists for Kazakhstan
Asian Games silver medalists for Kazakhstan
Asian Games bronze medalists for Kazakhstan
Medalists at the 2011 Asian Winter Games
Medalists at the 2017 Asian Winter Games
World Single Distances Speed Skating Championships medalists
21st-century Kazakhstani people